Legislative Assembly elections was held in the Indian state of West Bengal on 14 June 1977. The polls took place after the ousting of Indira Gandhi's government at the Centre. The Left Front won a landslide victory. The 1977 election marked the beginning of the 34-year Left Front rule in West Bengal, with Communist Party of India (Marxist) leader Jyoti Basu leading the first Left Front cabinet. The election finally put to rest, the decade-long political instability that had begun since 1967.

Background
After the Janata Party won the national parliamentary election in March 1977 the new government in Delhi opted to dissolve the assemblies in nine states where the Indian National Congress (R) had lost the parliamentary polls and call for fresh elections. West Bengal was one of these states. The Congress(R) opposed the dissolution of the assemblies, the incumbent West Bengal Congress(R) government petitioned the Supreme Court of India. The Supreme Court rejected the petition on 30 April 1977 and the West Bengal assembly was dissolved on order from the acting president B.D. Jatti.

Ahead of the March 1977 parliamentary election the Left Front (a new alliance led by the Communist Party of India (Marxist)) and the Janata Party had contested with a seat-sharing agreement. With the assembly elections approaching, the two sides sought to build a seat-sharing agreement. But the negotiation turned fruitless, and the Left Front and Janata Party parted ways. The Left Front had offered the Janata Party 56% of the seats and the post as Chief Minister to Janata Party leader Prafulla Chandra Sen, but the Janata Party insisted on 70% of the seats.

There were 25,984,474 eligible voters, voter turn-out stood at 56.15%.

Campaign
In most areas the West Bengal assembly election saw a triangular contest between the Left Front, the Congress(R) and the Janata Party for the 294 seats across the constituency. The Left Front fielded 293 candidates; CPI(M) contested 224 seats, the All India Forward Bloc 36, the Revolutionary Socialist Party 23, the Marxist Forward Bloc 3, the Revolutionary Communist Party of India 4, the Biplobi Bangla Congress 2 and 1 Left Front supported independent. Congress(R) contested 290 seats and Janata Party 289 seats.

Results
The Left Front won the election, winning 231 out of the 294 seats. The electoral result came as a surprise to the Left Front itself, as it had offered 52% of the seats in the pre-electoral seat sharing talks with the Janata Party. On 21 June 1977 the Left Front formed a government with Jyoti Basu as its Chief Minister. The first cabinet meeting of the Left Front government ordered the release of political prisoners.

Provisional Central Committee, Communist Party of India (Marxist-Leninist) leader Santosh Rana was elected as an independent from Gopiballavpur.

Elected members

References

West Bengal
State Assembly elections in West Bengal
1970s in West Bengal